Johan van den Corput (also van (den) Kornput, also Cornput or Johannes de Corput, in German literature Johannes Corputius (April 1542  – September 17, 1611) was a Dutch engineer, cartographer and military leader.

Corputius was born in Breda.  He is the author of the well colored Corputius Plan, which shows the city of Duisburg from the air, completed in 1566.  He died, aged 69, in Groningen.

Literature

Dutch literature 
 Jan Pieter Johannes Postema: Johan van den Corput: 1542-1611; kaartmaker, vestingbouwer, krijgsman, summary in English, Kampen: Ijsselakademie, 1993,

German literature
 Jan P. J. Postema: Johannes Corputius (1542-1611); Kriegsmann, Kartenzeichner, Festungsbauer; in: Kraume, Hans-Georg [ed.]: Duisburger Forschungen 35, Duisburg: Braun, 1987, p. 26-50; 
 Der Duisburger Stadtplan des Johannes Corputius von 1566, Multimedia-CD-Rom, ed.: Gerhard-Mercator-Gesellschaft e.V., Duisburg 2002
 Duisburg im Jahre 1566: der Stadtplan des Johannes Corputius (=Duisburger Forschungen 40), ed.: Joseph Milz / Günter von Roden, Duisburg 1993. 
 Heike Hawicks: Der Duisburger Stadtplan des Johannes Corputius von 1566, vom frühneuzeitlichen "Werbeprospekt" zur modernen Multimedia-CD-ROM, in: Duisburger Forschungen 51, Duisburg: Mercator-Verl., 2004, p. 225-234, 
 Frosien-Leinz, Heike: Der Corputius-Plan: Kommunales Selbstbewusstsein und Werbemittel, in: Frosien-Leinz, Heike [Red.]: Von Flandern zum Niederrhein: Wirtschaft und Kultur überwinden Grenzen; Begleitband zur Ausstellung, ed.: Stadt Duisburg - Die Oberbürgermeisterin, Kultur- und Stadthistorisches Museum Duisburg, 2000, p. 87-100, 
 Joseph Milz: Der Duisburger Stadtplan des Johannes Corputius und seine Vermessungsgrundlagen. In: Cartographica Helvetica Heft 11 (1995) p. 2–10, Volltext, reprint in: Kraume, Hans Georg [ed.]: Duisburger Forschungen Band 45. Duisburg: Mercator-Verl., 2000. p. 1-23. 
 Joseph Milz: Die Vermessung des Duisburger Stadtplanes von 1566 durch Johannes Corputius, in: Hantsche, Irmgard (ed.): Der "mathematicus": zur Entwicklung und Bedeutung einer neuen Berufsgruppe in der Zeit Gerhard Mercators [Referate des 4. Mercator-Symposiums, 30. - 31. Oktober 1995], Duisburger Mercator-Studien 4, Bochum: Brockmeyer, 1996, p. [227]-250, 
Joseph Milz: Neue Quellen und Forschungen zu Johannes Corputius, in Duisburger Forschungen, Band 31, ed.: Stadtarchiv Duisburg in Verbindung mit d. Mercator-Ges. [Für d. Schriftl. verantwortl.: Joseph Milz], Duisburg: Braun, 1982, p. 117-125,

External links 

16th-century Dutch cartographers
1542 births
1611 deaths
People from Breda
16th-century Dutch engineers
16th-century Dutch military personnel